The Edge of Seventeen is a 2016 American coming-of-age comedy-drama film written and directed by Kelly Fremon Craig, in her directorial debut. The film stars Hailee Steinfeld, Woody Harrelson, Kyra Sedgwick, and Haley Lu Richardson.

The film premiered at the 2016 Toronto International Film Festival on September 16, 2016, and was theatrically released on November 18, 2016, by STXfilms.

It received positive reviews, with Steinfeld's performance being critically acclaimed, and grossed over $19 million against a budget of $9 million.

Plot

Seventeen-year-old Nadine Franklin has tempestuous relationships with her popular older brother Darian and her image conscious mother Mona, and only felt close to her father Tom, who died of a heart attack when Nadine was thirteen, leaving her best friend Krista the only person keeping her buoyed.

Darian throws a pool party where Nadine and Krista get drunk. Nadine falls asleep while Krista talks to Darian. The next morning Nadine finds Krista giving Darian a handjob, straining their friendship. The next day at school Darian asks Krista to be his girlfriend. Nadine turns to her classmate Erwin Kim, who has a crush on her, though she is attracted to older student Nick Mossman.

Krista insists Nadine join her at a house party to which Darian has invited her. Krista is introduced to other students, leaving Nadine on her own. After failed attempts at mingling, Nadine sits outside with another partygoer, who remarks how inferior Nadine seems compared to her brother, and Nadine leaves the party. She invites Erwin to an amusement park, where she rejects his attempt to kiss her. At the end of the night Nadine tells him he is a great guy and they become close friends.

At school, Krista confronts Nadine for ignoring her, and Nadine says Darian does not care about Krista and will soon drop her. Krista retorts that Darian has asked her to prom, which is months away. She rejects Nadine's demand that she choose between herself and Darian, and Nadine ends their friendship.

For support at school, Nadine turns to Mr. Bruner, who says she is his favorite student. Nadine goes swimming in Erwin's pool and finds his house is luxurious and his family wealthy. She learns Erwin is a talented animation filmmaker, and accepts his invitation to their school's short-film festival.

Driving to school, Mona and Nadine have a fight that leads to Mona bringing Nadine with her to work. They argue about her father, and Nadine steals Mona's car. She writes a sexually explicit text to Nick and accidentally sends it.

Nadine flippantly tells Mr. Bruner she is going to kill herself, and he tries to reassure her. Nick replies asking her to hang out. Mona calls Darian, telling him that Nadine is missing and Darian leaves to find her. Nick, having believed Nadine's explicit text, repeatedly attempts to have sex with her in his car. Pushing him off, Nadine runs away and calls Mr. Bruner, who drives her to his house where they wait for Darian to arrive. Darian tells Nadine he has suffered from the pressures of taking their father’s place, saying he feels trapped and did not apply to distant colleges because the only person who makes him happy is Krista. Nadine confesses her own feelings of self-hatred and envy of Darian. They hug, ending their feud.

As Nadine leaves for the film festival, she meets Darian and Krista; the friends reconcile and agree to catch up later. Realizing that Mona is still worried she has run away, Nadine texts her that she is safe, and Mona decides to trust her word. Erwin's animated film is about an alien boy who falls in love with a girl at high school but is rejected. The girl resembles Nadine and wears sneakers similar to hers. After the film, Nadine hands Erwin flowers she picked for him and apologizes for taking so long to accept his affection. Erwin is congratulated by his colleagues and introduces Nadine, who greets them with a smile.

Cast

Production 
In 2011, screenwriter Kelly Fremon Craig sent a copy of her screenplay, Besties, to producer James L. Brooks, hoping that Brooks would produce the film. Craig recalled, "I had written a spec version of this film, and had been just an insane fan of Jim's for years and years. He was the crazy longshot I took in the beginning! And one I never thought would actually work. But I sent him the script and he ended up taking on the project." The Edge of Seventeen is Craig's directorial debut. She also produced the film.

On August 4, 2015, Hailee Steinfeld was cast in the film to play the lead role, while Richard Sakai was also attached as a producer of the film. On September 24, 2015, Woody Harrelson and Kyra Sedgwick joined the film's cast, with Harrelson playing the role of a high school teacher and Sedgwick as the main character's mother. On October 6, 2015, Blake Jenner was cast in the film as Nadine's older brother, a popular and handsome soccer player who begins dating Nadine's best friend Krista. Hayden Szeto was cast in the film as Erwin Kim, Nadine's earnest classmate, who fumbles several attempts to win her affection through much of the story. Haley Lu Richardson joined the film to play the role of Nadine's best friend Krista.

Principal photography on the film began on October 21, 2015, in Hollywood North, then in Anaheim, California. Filming also took place in the Metro Vancouver area, then at Guildford Park Secondary School and near Guildford Town Centre in Surrey, British Columbia. Port Moody was also shown, with the film festival taking place in City Hall. Filming wrapped on December 3, 2015.

Release 
The Edge of Seventeen, distributed by STX Entertainment, was originally scheduled to be released on September 30, 2016, before being moved to November 18. Stage 6 Films and Sony Pictures Releasing International handle some distribution rights to the film outside the United States.

The film was released on Blu-ray and DVD by Universal Home Entertainment on February 14, 2017.

Reception

Box office
The Edge of Seventeen grossed $14.4 million in the United States and Canada and $4.4 million in other territories for a total of $18.8 million, against a production budget of $9 million.

In North America, the film was released alongside the openings of Fantastic Beasts and Where to Find Them and Bleed for This, as well as the wide expansions of Moonlight and Billy Lynn's Long Halftime Walk, and was initially expected to gross around $8 million from 1,900 theaters. However, after grossing $1.8 million on its first day, weekend projections were lowered to $4–5 million; it ended up opening with $4.8 million, finishing number seven at the box office.

Critical response
On review aggregator Rotten Tomatoes, the film has an approval rating of 94% based on 216 reviews, with an average rating of 7.90/10. The website's critical consensus reads, "The Edge of Seventeens sharp script – and Hailee Steinfeld's outstanding lead performance – make this more than just another coming-of-age dramedy." On Metacritic, the film has a weighted average score of 77 out of 100, based on 38 critics, indicating "generally favorable reviews". Audiences polled by CinemaScore gave the film an average grade of "A−" on an A+ to F scale.

Accolades

Notes

Cancelled spin-off 
In May 2018, it was announced that YouTube Premium began development for a spin-off web series based on the film that would be exclusive to their platform. Annabel Oakes would pen the pilot, while Fremon Craig would executive produce the series. In May 2020, it was confirmed by Oakes that the series had been cancelled.

References

External links 

 
 
 

2016 films
2016 comedy-drama films
2016 directorial debut films
2010s buddy comedy-drama films
2010s coming-of-age comedy-drama films
2010s high school films
2010s teen comedy-drama films
American buddy comedy-drama films
American coming-of-age comedy-drama films
American high school films
American teen comedy-drama films
2010s English-language films
Films about siblings
Films about teacher–student relationships
Films produced by James L. Brooks
Films scored by Atli Örvarsson
Films set in 2011
Films set in 2015
Films set in Portland, Oregon
Films shot in California
Films shot in Vancouver
Films with screenplays by Kelly Fremon Craig
Gracie Films films
Huayi Brothers films
STX Entertainment films
Films about mother–daughter relationships
2010s American films